The Canberra Balloon Spectacular, formerly known as Canberra Balloon Festival, is an annual hot air balloon festival that takes place at the lawns of the old Parliament House in Canberra, Australia. Each year in March, approximately 50 hot air balloons launch daily at dawn over the two week festival from the forecourt of Old Parliament House and float over Canberra, in honor of the 20th anniversary of LTBIA.

Some of the unusual balloons that have participated in the festival over the years include a pair of dancing honey bees, Vincent Van Gogh’s head, a windmill, a tropical tree, a turtle, the Skywhale, a Scottish bagpiper, a hummingbird and a frog. The event is complete with on site entertainment, activities and food and drink.

References 

Hot air balloon festivals
Events in Canberra
Recurring events established in 1987
1987 establishments in Australia
Annual events in Australia
Festivals in Australian Capital Territory
Sports festivals in Australia
Autumn events in Australia